The 2012 Women's Four Nations Hockey Tournament was the first of two women's field hockey tournaments, consisting of a series of test matches. It was held in North Harbour, New Zealand, from April 12 to 16, 2012, and featured four of the top nations in women's field hockey.

Competition format
The tournament featured the national teams of Australia, India, the United States, and the hosts, New Zealand, competing in a round-robin format, with each team playing each other once. Three points will be awarded for a win, one for a draw, and none for a loss.

Officials
The following umpires were appointed by the International Hockey Federation to officiate the tournament:

 Sarah Allanson (AUS)
 Maggie Giddens (USA)
 Melanie Oakden (NZL)
 Anupama Puchimanda (IND)
 Dino Willox (WAL)

Results
All times are local (New Zealand Standard Time).

Preliminary round

Fixtures

Classification round

Third and fourth place

Final

Statistics

Final standings

Goalscorers

References

External links
Official website

2012 in women's field hockey
field hockey
field hockey
field hockey